The Organisation of Trade Unions of West Africa (OTUWA;) is a coalition of national trade union centres in West Africa. OTUWA was founded in 1983 in Conakry, Guinea, and is currently led by executive secretary John Ejoha Odah.

History 
In 1986, OTUWA was accorded consultative status by the Economic Community of West African States (ECOWAS) as the representative organisation of trade unions in West Africa. OTUWA supports the integration of process of ECOWAS, while calling for reductions in unemployment, integration of young workers into labour markets and the protection of migrant workers. 

In 2015, as part of a revival process, the headquarters of OTUWA was moved from Abidjan to Abuja in order to be closer to the ECOWAS secretariat. In 2017, OTUWA was critical of the ECOWAS states for the lack of growth in the region and called for measures to facilitate development. As of 2020, OTUWA has affiliates in all 15 ECOWAS states.

References

African trade union federations